"Way Out" is a song by American rapper Jack Harlow, featuring vocals from fellow American rapper Big Sean. It was released through Generation Now and Atlantic Records, as the second single from the former's debut studio album, Thats What They All Say, two days before the album, on December 9, 2020. The song's production was handled by JetsonMade, Jasper Harris and Heavy Mellow

Credits and personnel
Credits adapted from Tidal.
 Jackman Harlow – vocals, songwriting, composition
 Sean Anderson – vocals, featured artist, songwriting, composition
 Tahj Morgan – songwriting, composition, production
 Everett Romano – songwriting, composition, production
 Jasper Harris – songwriting, composition, production
 Nickie Pabón – recording, mixing
 Leslie Brathwaite – mixing
 Colin Leonard – mastering

Charts

Certifications

References

External links
 

2020 singles
2020 songs
Jack Harlow songs
Atlantic Records singles
Big Sean songs
Songs written by Big Sean
Songs written by Jack Harlow